Podokkhep ( "Footstep") is a 2006 Bengali film by Suman Ghosh.

Plot
At the end, the only love which lasts is the love that has accepted everything, every disappointment, every failure and every betrayal, which has accepted even the sad fact that in the end there is no desire as deep as the simple desire for companionship."

Inspired by this Graham Greene quote, "Podokkhep" is the story of an unusual bond between a retired man and a 5-year-old girl where he rediscovers life in his twilight years through this friendship.

Cast
Soumitra Chatterjee
Nandita Das
Sabitri Chatterjee
Tota Roy Choudhury
June Malia
Sweta Dutta
Bibhas Chakraborty
Jagannath Guha
Ashok Sharma

Awards
2006 National Film Awards (India)
 Won - Silver Lotus Award - Best Actor - Soumitra Chatterjee
 Won - Best Feature Film in Bengali - Suman Ghosh

References

External links

www.telegraphindia.com
http://www.screenindia.com/old/fullstory.php?content_id=14899
http://www.footstepsfilm.com/

2006 films
2000s Bengali-language films
Bengali-language Indian films
Films featuring a Best Actor National Award-winning performance
Best Bengali Feature Film National Film Award winners
Films directed by Suman Ghosh